Santalales is an order of flowering plants. Many of the members of the order are parasitic plants, mostly hemiparasites, able to produce sugars through photosynthesis, but tapping the stems or roots of other plants to obtain water and minerals, though some are obligate parasites, with low concentrations of chlorophyll and derive the majority of their sustenance from their hosts' vascular tissues. Most have seeds without testae (seed coats), which is unusual for flowering plants.

The anthophytes are a grouping of plant taxa bearing flower-like reproductive structures. They were formerly thought to be a clade comprising plants bearing flower-like structures.  The group contained the angiosperms - the extant flowering plants, such as roses and grasses - as well as the Gnetales and the extinct Bennettitales.

23,420 species of vascular plant have been recorded in South Africa, making it the sixth most species-rich country in the world and the most species-rich country on the African continent. Of these, 153 species are considered to be threatened. Nine biomes have been described in South Africa: Fynbos, Succulent Karoo, desert, Nama Karoo, grassland, savanna, Albany thickets, the Indian Ocean coastal belt, and forests.

The 2018 South African National Biodiversity Institute's National Biodiversity Assessment plant checklist lists 35,130 taxa in the phyla Anthocerotophyta (hornworts (6)), Anthophyta (flowering plants (33534)), Bryophyta (mosses (685)), Cycadophyta (cycads (42)), Lycopodiophyta (Lycophytes(45)), Marchantiophyta (liverworts (376)), Pinophyta (conifers (33)), and Pteridophyta (cryptogams (408)).

Three families are represented in the literature. Listed taxa include species, subspecies, varieties, and forms as recorded, some of which have subsequently been allocated to other taxa as synonyms, in which cases the accepted taxon is appended to the listing. Multiple entries under alternative names reflect taxonomic revision over time.

Loranthaceae
Family: Loranthaceae,

Actinanthella
Genus Actinanthella:
 Actinanthella wyliei (Sprague) Wiens, endemic

Agelanthus
Genus Agelanthus:
 Agelanthus crassifolius (Wiens) Polhill & Wiens, endemic
 Agelanthus gracilis (Toelken & Wiens) Polhill & Wiens, indigenous
 Agelanthus kraussianus (Meisn.) Polhill & Wiens, endemic
 Agelanthus lugardii (N.E.Br.) Polhill & Wiens, indigenous
 Agelanthus natalitius (Meisn.) Polhill & Wiens, indigenous
 Agelanthus natalitius (Meisn.) Polhill & Wiens subsp. natalitius, indigenous
 Agelanthus natalitius (Meisn.) Polhill & Wiens subsp. zeyheri (Harv.) Polhill & Wiens, indigenous
 Agelanthus prunifolius (E.Mey. ex Harv.) Polhill & Wiens, endemic
 Agelanthus pungu (De Wild.) Polhill & Wiens, endemic
 Agelanthus sambesiacus (Engl. & Schinz) Polhill & Wiens, endemic
 Agelanthus transvaalensis (Sprague) Polhill & Wiens, indigenous

Erianthemum
Genus Erianthemum:
 Erianthemum dregei (Eckl. & Zeyh.) Tiegh. indigenous
 Erianthemum ngamicum (Sprague) Danser, indigenous

Helixanthera
Genus Helixanthera:
 Helixanthera garciana (Engl.) Danser, indigenous
 Helixanthera subcylindrica (Sprague) Danser, accepted as Helixanthera woodii (Schltr. & K.Krause) Danser, present
 Helixanthera woodii (Schltr. & K.Krause) Danser, indigenous

Loranthus
Genus Loranthus:
 Loranthus natalitius Meisn. var. minor (Harv.) J.M.Wood, accepted as Agelanthus gracilis (Toelken & Wiens) Polhill & Wiens, indigenous

Moquinia
Genus Moquinia:
 Moquinia rubra A.Spreng. accepted as Moquiniella rubra (A.Spreng.) Balle, indigenous

Moquiniella
Genus Moquiniella:
 Moquiniella rubra (A.Spreng.) Balle, indigenous

Odontella
Genus Odontella:
 Odontella welwitschii (Engl.) Balle, accepted as Oncocalyx welwitschii (Engl.) Polhill & Wiens

Oncocalyx
Genus Oncocalyx:
 Oncocalyx bolusii (Sprague) Wiens & Polhill, indigenous
 Oncocalyx quinquenervius (Hochst.) Wiens & Polhill, endemic

Pedistylis
Genus Pedistylis:
 Pedistylis galpinii (Schinz ex Sprague) Wiens, indigenous

Plicosepalus
Genus Plicosepalus:
 Plicosepalus amplexicaulis Wiens, indigenous
 Plicosepalus kalachariensis (Schinz) Danser, indigenous
 Plicosepalus undulatus (E.Mey. ex Harv.) Tiegh. indigenous

Septulina
Genus Septulina:
 Septulina glauca (Thunb.) Tiegh. indigenous
 Septulina ovalis (E.Mey. ex Harv.) Tiegh. indigenous

Tapinanthus
Genus Tapinanthus:
 Tapinanthus carsonii (Baker & Sprague) Danser, accepted as Agelanthus pungu (De Wild.) Polhill & Wiens 
 Tapinanthus ceciliae (N.E.Br.) Danser, accepted as Agelanthus pungu (De Wild.) Polhill & Wiens, present
 Tapinanthus cinereus (Engl.) Danser, accepted as Phragmanthera cinerea (Engl.) Balle 
 Tapinanthus crassifolius Wiens, accepted as Agelanthus crassifolius (Wiens) Polhill & Wiens, present
 Tapinanthus discolor (Schinz) Danser, accepted as Agelanthus discolor (Schinz) Balle 
 Tapinanthus forbesii (Sprague) Wiens, indigenous
 Tapinanthus glaucocarpus (Peyr.) Danser, accepted as Phragmanthera glaucocarpa (Peyr.) Balle 
 Tapinanthus gracilis Toelken & Wiens, accepted as Agelanthus gracilis (Toelken & Wiens) Polhill & Wiens, present
 Tapinanthus guerichii (Engl.) Danser, accepted as Phragmanthera guerichii (Engl.) Balle 
 Tapinanthus kraussianus (Meisn.) Tiegh. subsp. kraussianus, accepted as Agelanthus kraussianus (Meisn.) Polhill & Wiens, present
 Tapinanthus kraussianus (Meisn.) Tiegh. subsp. transvaalensis (Sprague) Wiens, accepted as Agelanthus transvaalensis (Sprague) Polhill & Wiens, present
 Tapinanthus leendertziae (Sprague) Wiens, accepted as Tapinanthus quequensis (Weim.) Polhill & Wiens, present
 Tapinanthus lugardii (N.E.Br.) Danser, accepted as Agelanthus lugardii (N.E.Br.) Polhill & Wiens, present
 Tapinanthus natalitius (Meisn.) Danser subsp. natalitius, accepted as Agelanthus natalitius (Meisn.) Polhill & Wiens subsp. natalitius, present
 Tapinanthus natalitius (Meisn.) Danser subsp. zeyheri (Harv.) Wiens, accepted as Agelanthus natalitius (Meisn.) Polhill & Wiens subsp. zeyheri (Harv.) Polhill & Wiens, present
 Tapinanthus oleifolius (J.C.Wendl.) Danser, indigenous
 Tapinanthus prunifolius (E.Mey. ex Harv.) Tiegh. accepted as Agelanthus prunifolius (E.Mey. ex Harv.) Polhill & Wiens, present
 Tapinanthus quequensis (Weim.) Polhill & Wiens, indigenous
 Tapinanthus rubromarginatus (Engl.) Danser, indigenous
 Tapinanthus sambesiacus (Engl. & Schinz) Danser, accepted as Agelanthus sambesiacus (Engl. & Schinz) Polhill & Wiens, present
 Tapinanthus terminaliae (Engl. & Gilg) Danser, accepted as Agelanthus terminaliae (Engl. & Gilg) Polhill & Wiens

Tieghemia
Genus Tieghemia:
 Tieghemia bolusii (Sprague) Wiens, accepted as Oncocalyx bolusii (Sprague) Wiens & Polhill, present
 Tieghemia quinquenervius (Hochst.) Balle, accepted as Oncocalyx quinquenervius (Hochst.) Wiens & Polhill, present
 Tieghemia rogersii (Sprague ex Burtt Davy) Wiens, accepted as Oncocalyx bolusii (Sprague) Wiens & Polhill, present

Vanwykia
Genus Vanwykia:
 Vanwykia remota (Baker & Sprague) Wiens, indigenous

Olacaceae
Family: Olacaceae,

Olax
Genus Olax:
 Olax dissitiflora Oliv. indigenous

Ximenia
Genus Ximenia:
 Ximenia americana L. indigenous
 Ximenia americana L. var. microphylla Welw. ex Oliv. indigenous
 Ximenia caffra Sond. indigenous
 Ximenia caffra Sond. var. caffra, indigenous
 Ximenia caffra Sond. var. natalensis Sond. indigenous

Santalaceae
Family: Santalaceae,

Colpoon
Genus Colpoon:
 Colpoon compressum P.J.Bergius, indigenous
 Colpoon speciosum (A.W.Hill) P.A.Bean, indigenous

Lacomucinaea
Genus Lacomucinaea:
 Lacomucinaea lineata (L.f.) Nickrent & M.A.Garcia, indigenous

Osyridicarpos
Genus Osyridicarpos:
 Osyridicarpos schimperianus (Hochst. ex A.Rich.) A.DC. indigenous

Osyris
Genus Osyris:
 Osyris compressa (P.J.Bergius) A.DC. accepted as Colpoon compressum P.J.Bergius, indigenous
 Osyris lanceolata Hochst. & Steud. indigenous
 Osyris speciosa (A.W.Hill) J.C.Manning & Goldblatt, accepted as Colpoon speciosum (A.W.Hill) P.A.Bean, endemic

Rhoiacarpos
Genus Rhoiacarpos:
 Rhoiacarpos capensis (Harv.) A.DC. endemic

Thesidium
Genus Thesidium:
 Thesidium exocarpaeoides Sond. accepted as Thesium microcarpum A.DC. indigenous
 Thesidium fragile (Thunb.) Sond. accepted as Thesium confusum J.C.Manning & F.Forest, endemic
 Thesidium fruticulosum A.W.Hill, accepted as Thesium fruticulosum (A.W.Hill) J.C.Manning & F.Forest, endemic
 Thesidium globosum (A.DC.) A.DC. accepted as Thesium strigulosum A.DC. indigenous
 Thesidium hirtum Sond. accepted as Thesium strigulosum A.DC. endemic
 Thesidium leptostachyum (A.DC.) Sond. accepted as Thesium leptostachyum A.DC. endemic
 Thesidium longifolium A.W.Hill, accepted as Thesium fruticulosum (A.W.Hill) J.C.Manning & F.Forest, indigenous
 Thesidium microcarpum (A.DC.) A.DC. accepted as Thesium microcarpum A.DC. indigenous
 Thesidium minus A.W.Hill, accepted as Thesium fruticulosum (A.W.Hill) J.C.Manning & F.Forest, indigenous
 Thesidium podocarpum (A.DC.) A.DC. accepted as Thesium fragile L.f. indigenous
 Thesidium thunbergii Sond. accepted as Thesium fragile L.f. indigenous

Thesium
Genus Thesium:
 Thesium abietinum Schltr. accepted as Thesium imbricatum Thunb. present
 Thesium acuminatum A.W.Hill, endemic
 Thesium acutissimum A.DC. indigenous
 Thesium affine Schltr. accepted as Thesium quinqueflorum Sond. present
 Thesium aggregatum A.W.Hill, endemic
 Thesium alatum Hilliard & B.L.Burtt, indigenous
 Thesium albomontanum Compton, endemic
 Thesium angulosum DC. endemic
 Thesium annulatum A.W.Hill, endemic
 Thesium archeri Compton, endemic
 Thesium aristatum Schltr. accepted as Thesium spinulosum A.DC. present
 Thesium asperifolium A.W.Hill, endemic
 Thesium asterias A.W.Hill, indigenous
 Thesium bathyschistum Schltr. endemic
 Thesium boissierianum A.DC. endemic
 Thesium brachygyne Schltr. endemic
 Thesium breyeri N.E.Br. indigenous
 Thesium burchellii A.W.Hill, indigenous
 Thesium burkei A.W.Hill, accepted as Thesium resedoides A.W.Hill, indigenous
 Thesium capitatum L. endemic
 Thesium capitellatum A.DC. endemic
 Thesium capituliflorum Sond. endemic
 Thesium carinatum A.DC. indigenous
 Thesium carinatum A.DC. var. carinatum, endemic
 Thesium carinatum A.DC. var. pallidum A.W.Hill, endemic
 Thesium celatum N.E.Br. indigenous
 Thesium commutatum Sond. endemic
 Thesium confine Sond. indigenous
 Thesium confusum J.C.Manning & F.Forest, endemic
 Thesium congestum R.A.Dyer, indigenous
 Thesium conostylum Schltr. accepted as Thesium hispidulum Lam. ex Sond. var. subglabrum A.W.Hill, present
 Thesium cordatum A.W.Hill, indigenous
 Thesium coriarium A.W.Hill, indigenous
 Thesium cornigerum A.W.Hill, endemic
 Thesium corymbuligerum Sond. accepted as Thesium virgatum Lam. present
 Thesium costatum A.W.Hill, indigenous
 Thesium costatum A.W.Hill var. costatum, indigenous
 Thesium costatum A.W.Hill var. juniperinum A.W.Hill, indigenous
 Thesium costatum A.W.Hill var. paniculatum N.E.Br. indigenous
 Thesium crassifolium Sond. endemic
 Thesium cupressoides A.W.Hill, indigenous
 Thesium cymosum A.W.Hill, indigenous
 Thesium cytisoides A.W.Hill, accepted as Thesium utile A.W.Hill, present
 Thesium davidsonae Brenan, endemic
 Thesium deceptum N.E.Br. endemic
 Thesium decipiens Hilliard & B.L.Burtt, indigenous
 Thesium densiflorum A.DC. endemic
 Thesium densum N.E.Br. endemic
 Thesium disciflorum A.W.Hill, endemic
 Thesium disparile N.E.Br. endemic
 Thesium dissitiflorum Schltr. endemic
 Thesium diversifolium Sond. endemic
 Thesium dumale N.E.Br. accepted as Thesium resedoides A.W.Hill, endemic
 Thesium durum Hilliard & B.L.Burtt, indigenous
 Thesium ecklonianum Sond. endemic
 Thesium elatius Sond. endemic
 Thesium ephedroides A.W.Hill, accepted as Lacomucinaea lineata (L.f.) Nickrent & M.A.Garcia 
 Thesium equisetoides Welw. ex Hiern, indigenous
 Thesium ericaefolium A.DC. endemic
 Thesium euphorbioides L. endemic
 Thesium euphrasioides A.DC. endemic
 Thesium exile N.E.Br. endemic
 Thesium fallax Schltr. endemic
 Thesium fimbriatum A.W.Hill, endemic
 Thesium flexuosum A.DC. endemic
 Thesium foliosum A.DC. endemic
 Thesium fragile L.f. endemic
 Thesium fragile Link ex A.DC. accepted as Thesium crassifolium Sond. present
 Thesium frisea L. var. frisea, endemic
 Thesium frisea L. var. thunbergii A.DC. endemic
 Thesium fructicosum A.W.Hill, endemic
 Thesium fruticulosum (A.W.Hill) J.C.Manning & F.Forest, endemic
 Thesium funale L. endemic
 Thesium galioides A.DC. endemic
 Thesium glaucescens A.W.Hill, endemic
 Thesium globosum A.DC. accepted as Thesium strigulosum A.DC. indigenous
 Thesium glomeratum A.W.Hill, endemic
 Thesium glomeruliflorum Sond. endemic
 Thesium gnidiaceum A.DC. indigenous
 Thesium gnidiaceum A.DC. var. gnidiaceum, endemic
 Thesium gnidiaceum A.DC. var. zeyheri Sond. endemic
 Thesium goetzeanum Engl. indigenous
 Thesium gracilarioides A.W.Hill, indigenous
 Thesium gracile A.W.Hill, indigenous
 Thesium gracilentum N.E.Br. indigenous
 Thesium griseum Sond. indigenous
 Thesium gypsophiloides A.W.Hill, indigenous
 Thesium helichrysoides A.W.Hill, accepted as Thesium penicillatum A.W.Hill, present
 Thesium hillianum Compton, endemic
 Thesium hirsutum A.W.Hill, endemic
 Thesium hispidulum Lam. ex Sond. indigenous
 Thesium hispidulum Lam. ex Sond. var. hispidulum, endemic
 Thesium hispidulum Lam. ex Sond. var. subglabrum A.W.Hill, endemic
 Thesium hispidum Schltr. accepted as Thesium hispidulum Lam. ex Sond. var. hispidulum, present
 Thesium hollandii Compton, endemic
 Thesium horridum Pilg. endemic
 Thesium hystricoides A.W.Hill, indigenous
 Thesium hystrix A.W.Hill, indigenous
 Thesium imbricatum Thunb. indigenous
 Thesium impeditum A.W.Hill, indigenous
 Thesium inversum N.E.Br. endemic
 Thesium jeanae Brenan, indigenous
 Thesium junceum Bernh. indigenous
 Thesium junceum Bernh. var. junceum, endemic
 Thesium junceum Bernh. var. mammosum A.W.Hill, endemic
 Thesium junceum Bernh. var. plantagineum A.W.Hill, endemic
 Thesium juncifolium DC. endemic
 Thesium junodii A.W.Hill, endemic
 Thesium karooicum Compton, endemic
 Thesium lacinulatum A.W.Hill, indigenous
 Thesium leptocaule Sond. endemic
 Thesium leptostachyum A.DC. endemic
 Thesium lesliei N.E.Br. indigenous
 Thesium lineatum L.f. accepted as Lacomucinaea lineata (L.f.) Nickrent & M.A.Garcia, indigenous
 Thesium lisae-mariae Stauffer, endemic
 Thesium litoreum Brenan, endemic
 Thesium lobelioides A.DC. indigenous
 Thesium macrogyne A.W.Hill, indigenous
 Thesium macrostachyum A.DC. endemic
 Thesium magalismontanum Sond. indigenous
 Thesium marlothii Schltr. endemic
 Thesium maximiliani Schltr. accepted as Thesium rariflorum Sond. present
 Thesium megalocarpum A.W.Hill, indigenous
 Thesium microcarpum A.DC. endemic
 Thesium microcephalum A.W.Hill, endemic
 Thesium micromeria A.DC. endemic
 Thesium micropogon A.DC. endemic
 Thesium minus (A.W.Hill) J.C.Manning & F.Forest, endemic
 Thesium mossii N.E.Br. endemic
 Thesium multiramulosum Pilg. indigenous
 Thesium namaquense Schltr. endemic
 Thesium natalense Sond. indigenous
 Thesium nationae A.W.Hill, endemic
 Thesium nigromontanum Sond. endemic
 Thesium nigrum A.W.Hill, indigenous
 Thesium nudicaule A.W.Hill, endemic
 Thesium occidentale A.W.Hill, endemic
 Thesium oresigenum Compton, endemic
 Thesium orientale A.W.Hill, endemic
 Thesium pallidum A.DC. indigenous
 Thesium paniculatum L. endemic
 Thesium paronychioides Sond. endemic
 Thesium patersoniae A.W.Hill, endemic
 Thesium patulum A.W.Hill, endemic
 Thesium penicillatum A.W.Hill, endemic
 Thesium phyllostachyum Sond. endemic
 Thesium pinifolium A.DC. endemic
 Thesium pleuroloma A.W.Hill, endemic
 Thesium podocarpum A.DC. accepted as Thesium fragile L.f. indigenous
 Thesium polycephalum Schltr. endemic
 Thesium polygaloides A.W.Hill, endemic
 Thesium pottiae N.E.Br. indigenous
 Thesium procerum N.E.Br. indigenous
 Thesium prostratum A.W.Hill, endemic
 Thesium pseudovirgatum Levyns, endemic
 Thesium pubescens A.DC. endemic
 Thesium pungens A.W.Hill, endemic
 Thesium pycnanthum Schltr. endemic
 Thesium quinqueflorum Sond. endemic
 Thesium racemosum Bernh. indigenous
 Thesium rariflorum Sond. endemic
 Thesium rasum (A.W.Hill) N.E.Br. indigenous
 Thesium repandum A.W.Hill, endemic
 Thesium resedoides A.W.Hill, indigenous
 Thesium resinifolium N.E.Br. endemic
 Thesium rigidum Sond. indigenous
 Thesium rogersii A.W.Hill, accepted as Thesium goetzeanum Engl. indigenous
 Thesium rufescens A.W.Hill, endemic
 Thesium scabrum L. endemic
 Thesium scandens E.Mey. ex Sond. endemic
 Thesium schumannianum Schltr. endemic
 Thesium scirpioides A.W.Hill, indigenous
 Thesium sedifolium A.DC. ex Levyns, accepted as Thesium crassifolium Sond. present
 Thesium selagineum A.DC. endemic
 Thesium semotum N.E.Br. endemic
 Thesium sertulariastrum A.W.Hill, endemic
 Thesium sonderianum Schltr. endemic
 Thesium spartioides A.W.Hill, indigenous
 Thesium spicatum L. endemic
 Thesium spinosum L.f. endemic
 Thesium spinulosum A.DC. endemic
 Thesium squarrosum L.f. indigenous
 Thesium strictum P.J.Bergius, endemic
 Thesium strigulosum A.DC. endemic
 Thesium subnudum Sond. indigenous
 Thesium subnudum Sond. var. foliosum A.W.Hill, endemic
 Thesium subnudum Sond. var. subnudum, endemic
 Thesium subsimile N.E.Br. endemic
 Thesium susannae A.W.Hill, endemic
 Thesium thunbergianum A.DC. accepted as Thesium selagineum A.DC. present
 Thesium translucens A.W.Hill, endemic
 Thesium transvaalense Schltr. endemic
 Thesium triflorum Thunb. ex L.f. indigenous
 Thesium umbelliferum A.W.Hill, endemic
 Thesium urceolatum A.W.Hill, endemic
 Thesium utile A.W.Hill, indigenous
 Thesium vahrmeijeri Brenan, endemic
 Thesium virens E.Mey. ex A.DC. endemic
 Thesium virgatum Lam. endemic
 Thesium viridifolium Levyns, endemic
 Thesium viscibaccatum Dinter, accepted as Lacomucinaea lineata (L.f.) Nickrent & M.A.Garcia 
 Thesium whitehillensis Compton, endemic
 Thesium zeyheri A.DC. indigenous

Viscum
Genus Viscum:
 Viscum anceps E.Mey. ex Sprague, endemic
 Viscum capense L.f. indigenous
 Viscum capense L.f. subsp. hoolei Wiens, accepted as Viscum hoolei Wiens, present
 Viscum combreticola Engl. indigenous
 Viscum continuum E.Mey. ex Sprague, endemic
 Viscum crassulae Eckl. & Zeyh. endemic
 Viscum dielsianum Dinter ex Neusser, indigenous
 Viscum hoolei Wiens, indigenous
 Viscum menyharthii Engl. & Schinz, indigenous
 Viscum minimum Harv. endemic
 Viscum nervosum Hochst. ex A.Rich. accepted as Viscum triflorum DC. 
 Viscum obovatum Harv. indigenous
 Viscum obscurum Thunb. indigenous
 Viscum oreophilum Wiens, indigenous
 Viscum pauciflorum L.f. endemic
 Viscum rotundifolium L.f. indigenous
 Viscum schaeferi Engl. & K.Krause, indigenous
 Viscum spragueanum Burtt Davy, accepted as Viscum tuberculatum A.Rich. present
 Viscum subserratum Schltr. indigenous
 Viscum triflorum DC. indigenous
 Viscum triflorum DC. subsp. nervosum (Hochst. ex A.Rich.) M.G.Gilbert, accepted as Viscum triflorum DC. present
 Viscum tuberculatum A.Rich. indigenous
 Viscum verrucosum Harv. indigenous

References

South African plant biodiversity lists
Santalales